Warren Boroson (January 22, 1935 - March 12, 2023) was an American author and journalist.  He has written over 20 books, including How to Pick Stocks Like Warren Buffett, Keys to Investing in Mutual Funds and How to Buy a House for Nothing (or Little) Down. His most recent book is "Scandalous Stories About Famous Singers & Composers," a book self-published through Amazon. He is also the author of The Reverse Mortgage Advantage: The Tax-Free, House Rich Way to Retire Wealthy! He has also written for numerous magazines, such as New York Times Magazine, Woman's Day, TV Guide, Better Homes and Gardens, Reader's Digest, Consumer Reports, Family Circle, and Cosmopolitan Magazine. His play, Blasphemy, is about the 1697 prosecution and execution of Thomas Aikenhead for blasphemy. Warren Boroson died on March 12, 2023.

Early life
Warren Boroson grew up on Boulevard East in West New York, New Jersey, where he attended P.S. No. 6 and graduated from Memorial High School in January 1952. He attended Columbia University, where he intended to pursue education, though prior to graduating, he decided on a career as a journalist. He graduated in 1957.

Career
In 1964, Boroson was managing editor of Fact Magazine, which was sued by Barry Goldwater for articles it published questioning Goldwater's psychological fitness to be president. Boroson has stated that David Bar-Illan was the creator of the article that helped lead to the lawsuit, even though his name was not listed originally. Boroson later asserted that Goldwater sued him and the magazine for two million dollars. Goldwater collected $75,000 from the publisher and the magazine, and $1 from the publisher, the magazine, and Boroson.

For the years 1990 and 2000, Boroson won the top business news-writing award from Rutgers/CIT. In 1996, he won the Investment Company Institute/American University personal finance writing award. In 2002 and 2004 he won the New Jersey Press Association's top business-writing award. He was formerly on staff at Money magazine and at Sylvia Porter's Personal Finance Magazine.

Boroson's career at the Daily Record of Morris County, New Jersey, ended rather abruptly in 2007. A new editor killed his nationally syndicated financial column, claiming that it was not local enough. (Boroson has maintained that the new editor had told him that readers identify him with the newspaper—and "I knew then that my goose was cooked.") After his column was killed, Boroson resigned.

He has had articles published in the New York Times Magazine, Woman's Day, TV Guide, Better Homes and Gardens, Reader's Digest, Consumer Reports, Family Circle, and Cosmopolitan Magazine.

Boroson taught music courses at the Bard LLI, Marist, and SUNY. He has also taught at the County College of Morris in Randolph, New Jersey, and at The New School, Fairleigh Dickinson University, Ramapo College, and Rutgers University.

In 2008, Boroson began teaching courses on famous singers of the past—Rosa Ponselle, Richard Crooks, Lotte Schoene, Conchita Supervia.

In 2013, Boroson was teaching music classes at Bard LLI. 
He won third place in the 2009 New Jersey Society of Professional Journalists contest for sports articles in a weekly, and first place for feature articles.
He won a second and a third place in 2013.

Personal life
Boroson lived in Woodstock, New York.

Selected bibliography
The Best of Fact. Trident Press, 1967. ASIN B0006BRBJG – with Ralph Ginzburg
How to buy or sell your home in a changing market. Medical Economics Books, 1983. 
Physicians' guide to professional and personal advisers. Medical Economics Books, 1985. 
How to Sell Your House in a Buyer's Market. Wiley, 1990. , with Martin M. Shenkman
Save Thousands on Your Mortgage: The Best Investment You Can Make. MacMillan of Canada, 1990. 
Mutual Fund Switch Strategies and Timing Tactics (The Investor's Self-Teaching Seminars). Probus Professional Publishing, 1991. 
Keys to Investing for Your Child's Future. Barron's Educational Series, 1992. 
The Home Buyer's Inspection Guide : Everything You Need to Know to Save $$ and Get A Better House. Wiley, 1993. , with Ken Austin. 
Keys to Retirement Planning. Barron's Educational Series, 2nd ed. 1995. 
Keys to Saving Money on Income Taxes. Barron's Educational Series, 2nd ed. 1995. 
The Ultimate Stock Picker's Guide: 24 Top Experts Recommend 25 Stocks to Buy & Hold. Probus Professional Publishing, 1995. 
Keys to Investing in Mutual Funds. Barron's Educational Series, 3rd ed. 1997. 
The Ultimate Mutual Fund Guide: 19 Experts Pick the 33 Top Funds You Should Own. Irwin Professional Publishing, 1997. 
Keys to Investing in Your 401K. Barron's Educational Series, 2000. 
How to Buy a House with No (or Little) Money Down, 3rd Edition Wiley, 2001. , with Martin M. Shenkman
J. K. Lasser's Pick Stocks Like Warren Buffett. Wiley, 2001. 
The Reverse Mortgage Advantage : The Tax-Free, House Rich Way to Retire Wealthy! McGraw-Hill, 2006.

References

Ginzburg v. Goldwater 396 U.S. 1049 (1970)

External links
Warren Boroson's blog

1935 births
Living people
American columnists
American finance and investment writers
Fairleigh Dickinson University faculty
Writers from Hackensack, New Jersey
Memorial High School (West New York, New Jersey) alumni
People from West New York, New Jersey
Columbia College (New York) alumni